Eustacio Chamorro was a Paraguayan football defender who played for Paraguay in the 1930 FIFA World Cup. He also played for Club Presidente Hayes.

References

External links

Paraguayan footballers
Paraguay international footballers
Association football defenders
Club Presidente Hayes footballers
1930 FIFA World Cup players
Year of birth missing
Year of death missing